is a Tokyo Kyuko Electric Railway Ikegami Line station located in Ōta, Tokyo.

Station layout
The station has two ground-level side platforms.

Bus service 
Hasunuma Station bus stop
Tokyu Bus
<品94> Shinagawa Sta. (via Ikegami Sta., Ikegami Garage, Ōmori Sta. and Ōimachi Sta.)
<井03> Oimachi Sta. (via Ikegami Sta., Ikegami Garage and Omori Sta.)
<蒲15> Ebaracho Sta. Entrance (via Ikegami Sta., Ikegami Garage and Magome Sta.)
<蒲12> Den-en-chofu Sta. (via Ikegami police station and Yukigaya)
<蒲01> Rokugo-Dote
<品94, 井03, 蒲01, 蒲12, 蒲15> Kamata Sta.

History 
The station was opened by Ikegami Electric Railway in October 1922.

References

External links   
  Hasunuma Station  (Tokyu)  

Railway stations in Tokyo
Railway stations in Japan opened in 1922
Tokyu Ikegami Line
Stations of Tokyu Corporation